Eduard Torres Girbau (born May 26, 1964) is a basketball coach. He is currently head coach of the Thai national team .

Coach career 
1985–86  Joventut Badalona (youth team)
1987–96  Festina Andorra
1997–99  Climalia León
1999–03  Caprabo Lleida
2003–06  Akasvayu Girona
2006–09  Plus Pujol Lleida
2009–10  CB Murcia
2011–12  Força Lleida CE
2013–14  Huracanes de Tampico
2014–15  
   2016   Toros de Aragua
2016–19   Eastern Long Lions
   2020   Guaiqueríes de Margarita
2021–22   Halcones de Xalapa
2022 -  Thai national team

Honours 
Plus Pujol Lleida

LEB Champions: 1
2001
ACB Catalan League Champions: 2
2002, 2003
LEB Catalan League Champion: 2
2007, 2008
AEEB Coach of the Year: 1
2002
ASEAN Basketball League: 1
2016–17
ABL Coach of the Year: 1
2016–17

Coaching record

References

External links
Edu Torres profile

Living people
1964 births
ASEAN Basketball League coaches
Catalan basketball coaches
Liga ACB head coaches
Eastern Sports Club basketball coaches